Welcome Wade Wilson Jr. (born 1951) is President and Chief Executive Officer of the Welcome Group—a privately held real estate development firm with its headquarters in Houston, Texas (USA).  He served as the Vice Chairman on the Board of Regents of the University of Houston System, and attended the University of Denver.

Early life 

Wilson graduated from Kinkaid High School in 1969.  He attended University of Denver in 1970. Where he became president of the fraternity Sigma Alpha Epsilon

Business
Welcome Wilson Jr. is CEO/PRESIDENT of the commercial real-estate company Welcome Group. He served as Vice Chairman of the University of Houston System Board of Regents.

References

External links 

UH System Board member profile
GSL Welcome Group
 Wilson, Welcome and Joseph Pratt. Welcome Wilson Oral History, Houston Oral History Project, September 17, 2007.

American businesspeople
People from Houston
1951 births
University of Houston System regents
University of Denver alumni
Living people